Ronald Charles Eric Bywater (8 January 1919 – 18 May 1975) was an Australian rules footballer who played with South Melbourne in the Victorian Football League (VFL).

A key position player, Bywater missed many games early in his career due to his war service. He made just two appearances from 1942 to 1945. During the 1946 season, in July, Bywater announced his retirement, due to heart problems. He however returned the following year and in what was his first full season came within five votes of winning the 1947 Brownlow Medal, finishing equal third  and was runner up to Bill Williams in the 1947 club best and fairest award.

As a result of a broken ankle, Bywater was out of action for much of the 1948 season. He was used up forward in 1949 and kicked 25 goals from his 16 appearances. Only Dick Jones kicked more goals for South Melbourne that year.

Bywater left South Melbourne midway through the 1950 season and joined Corowa, a club which he would later coach? He was reunited with former teammate Billy King, the then captain-coach. 

Bywater transferred to the Rutherglen Football Club in 1951.

References

1919 births
Australian rules footballers from Victoria (Australia)
Sydney Swans players
Corowa Football Club players
Corowa Football Club coaches
Australian Army personnel of World War II
1975 deaths
Australian Army soldiers